The 2012 Sefton Metropolitan Borough Council election took on 3 May 2012 to elect members of Sefton Metropolitan Borough Council in England, as part of the 2012 United Kingdom local elections. 22 seats, representing one third of the total Council membership, were up for election in single-member wards. Ten - nearly half - of the members elected were newcomers to the Council; five of these defeated sitting Councillors seeking re-election, whilst in the other five wards, the incumbent retired. Two incumbents stood under different labels to those they were elected under in 2008; both were defeated in their wards.

The election resulted in a landslide for the Labour Party, which won 48% of the popular vote and 15 of the seats up for election - more than double the seven it went into the election with. Labour won a clean sweep in the southern constituencies of Sefton Central and Bootle. This brought the total number of seats controlled by Labour on the Council up to 36 giving the party an overall majority of six. As a result, the Sefton Labour Group formed a majority administration for the first time since the Council's creation in 1973. Although the party failed to make a breakthrough in the northern town of Southport, it did win more than 20% of the popular vote there, a feat it has not achieved at a general election since 1966. The party also out-polled Conservative Party in three of Southport's seven wards and out-polled a sitting Councillor (in Duke's Ward) for the first time in years.

The election representing a serious defeat for the other three parties defending seats. All incumbent Conservatives seeking re-election were defeated, including group leader Paula Parry who lost her Blundellsands ward to Labour on a swing of nearly 22%. Only one Conservative was elected; newcomer Ted Hartill successfully defended outgoing deputy leader Brenda Porter's seat of Ainsdale, though the Conservative margin of victory was cut from 45 in 2008 to just 15 points. They lost a third of the support they had attained in the 2011 borough election, falling into third place in terms of votes and being left with just eight seats on the Council. Their 17% share of the vote was well below the national party's 31%.

For the Liberal Democrats, the result was slightly better but still represented a crushing defeat for a party that only two years previously had been the largest on Sefton Council. They gained two seats in Southport from the Conservatives (including one Independent Conservative) and retained all the seats they were defending there but lost all five they were defending in the south of the borough to Labour, reducing their overall strength from 23 to 20. Their share of the vote was only 19% across all of Sefton however, scarcely more than the party's national average of 16% and leaving them nearly thirty points behind Labour. In roughly a third of the seats up for election the Lib Dems won less than 100 votes.

Additionally, the United Kingdom Independence Party lost its sole seat on the Council. Former Conservative Councillor and mayor Alf Doran, who had crossed the floor to join UKIP in 2011, was defeated in his bid to be re-elected. He finished a close third, just 77 votes behind the Conservatives and 85 behind the victorious Labour Party. No other party was able to return members to the Council; only the local issues Southport Party came remotely close in Norwood, where its candidate finished a distant third behind Labour and the Lib Dems. The only independent, a former Conservative Councillor seeking re-election, was defeated.

Ward results

Asterisk (*) denotes an incumbent seeking re-election.

References

2012 English local elections
2012
2010s in Merseyside